Harmon Township is located in Lee County, Illinois.  As of the 2010 census, its population was 378 and it contained 161 housing units. Harmon Township was formed from Marion Township on March 3, 1857.

Geography

Demographics

References

External links 
 US Census
 City-data.com
 Cook County Official Site
 Illinois State Archives

Townships in Lee County, Illinois
1857 establishments in Illinois
Populated places established in 1857
Townships in Illinois